Luana Florencia Muñoz (born 22 January 1999) is an Argentine footballer who plays as a centre-back for Racing Club de Avellaneda and the Argentina women's national team. She transferred to Texas Tech after two seasons at Tyler Junior College.

International career
Muñoz represented Argentina at the 2014 South American U-20 Women's Championship. She made her senior debut for Argentina on 28 February 2019 in a 0–5 friendly loss against South Korea.

Personal life
Muñoz is a supporter of Racing. She also supports the movement to make abortion legal, safe, and free in Argentina.

References

1999 births
Living people
Sportspeople from Avellaneda
Argentine women's footballers
Women's association football central defenders
Club Atlético River Plate (women) players
UAI Urquiza (women) players
Tyler Apaches women's soccer players
Argentina women's international footballers
Argentine expatriate women's footballers
Argentine expatriate sportspeople in the United States
Expatriate women's soccer players in the United States
Argentine abortion-rights activists
Texas Tech Red Raiders women's soccer players